Tallinna TV was a television channel in Estonia, formerly called Tallinn Eesti Televisioon. It had transmitters in Tallinn, Pärnu, Valgjärve, Kohtla-Nõmme, and Orissaare prior to its diffusion.

Supervisory Board Members
 Allan Alaküla (chairman)
 Leonid Mihhailov
 Aini Härm
 Andres Kollist
 Kaja Laanmäe
 Toivo Tootsen

Executive Board Members
 Toomas Lepp
 Mart Ummelas

References

External links

Television channels in Estonia
Defunct television channels in Estonia
Mass media in Tallinn
Television channels and stations established in 2011
2011 establishments in Estonia